Abdul Rashid Ghazi (– 10 July 2007) was a Pakistani Islamic fundamentalist who served as the vice-chancellor of Faridia University. Prior to his radicalisation, he served as a diplomat for UNESCO. He was the son of Muhammad Abdullah Ghazi, and younger brother of Abdul Aziz Ghazi.

Abdul Rashid was killed during Operation Silence after Pakistan Army Special Operations Commandos' teams stormed the madrasah he and his students had been using.

Early life 
He was an ethnic Baloch, descending from the Sadwani (Sodvani) clan of the Mazari tribe, in the town of Basti-Abdullah near Rojhan in Rajanpur, the border district of Punjab province of Pakistan.

In his youth, Abdul Rashid defied his father's wish that he receive formal Islamic education as he wanted to live a modern life. He completed his Master of Science degree in History from Quaid-e-Azam University Islamabad in 1987–1988. A photo of him and his classmates still hangs on the history department's wall. According to one of his professors, "He was a normal, modern student and a lively fellow who was well adjusted to a co-educational system." Remembered by his friends as "a bright student and an active member of a progressive student organisation", "He could have been a diplomat in the foreign office or an educationist", his friend once stated in an interview.

He was non-religious during that time, hardly if ever going to the mosque and reading authors like Karl Marx, Max Weber and Henry Kissinger, "his greatest ambition was to become a diplomat at the United Nations", a friend added, to the extent that he stopped talking to his father, who was antagonized by his "Westernized" lifestyle. Declan Walsh also quotes peoples who knew him during this time, saying that he was a secularized student reading the likes of Nietzsche and Rousseau, mingling with women and being fond of singing.

Diplomatic career 

Having completed his M.Sc. in History, he secured a position at the Pakistan National Commission and later joined the Ministry of Education in Islamabad as a Grade-17 officer, where he briefly served as the editor of its monthly magazine, Piyami.

He subsequently worked with UNESCO, a specialized agency of the United Nations (UN), and served in Paris.

Soviet–Afghan War

During the Soviet–Afghan War, Ghazi's father Muhammad Abdullah Ghazi played a major role in recruiting and training Mujahideen. Ghazi and his brother Abdul Aziz also did a brief stint of fighting. According to a friend of Ghazi who was with him during the Soviet–Afghan War, they fought against the Soviets multiple times in Paktia Province, near the Afghanistan–Pakistan border. Ghazi was nearly killed when a land mine exploded next to him; after this incident he assumed the title of Ghazi, meaning "warrior". Declan Walsh quotes a friend of Ghazi who says that Ghazi was more excited by the glamour and adventure of war, than by any strictly religious aspect of it.

Meeting Osama bin Laden 
In 1998, Ghazi and his father met Osama bin Laden. Ghazi, when referring to these events, stated: "The meeting inspired me to work for the establishment of Islam." He recalled that at the end of the meeting, he picked up and drank water from a cup which bin Laden had used. An amused bin Laden asked Ghazi why he had done so, to which Ghazi replied: "I drank from your glass so that Allah would make me a great warrior like you." During this visit to bin Laden and Mullah Omar in Kandahar, Ghazi became radicalized and eschewed his former modernist outlook.

Father's assassination 
Ghazi's father was killed a week after he returned from Kandahar with Ghazi, on 17 October 1998. Ghazi's father gave lectures at Faridia University in Sector E-7 of Islamabad. Upon arriving at the seminary that day, he approached his elder son Abdul Aziz to speak to him. A man standing in front of the door walked towards Ghazi's father, pulled out a gun and opened fire until the magazine was empty, fatally wounding his target. Afterwards, the assassin reloaded and fired at Abdul Aziz, who barely escaped death. The assassin escaped with the help of an accomplice waiting outside in a car. Ghazi's father died of his injuries on the way to the hospital.

Ghazi lodged a reported and the police began investigating the case. A suspect was soon arrested, and several eyewitnesses identified the assassin in a police lineup. However, he was released the next day without reason. Ghazi protested against the release and warned the police of legal action if the suspect was not rearrested soon. With Ghazi increasing pressure on police, he was asked to withdraw the case or face the fate of his father. According to his friend, this was turning point in Ghazi's life, and he became disillusioned with the system.

Post-2001
Ghazi adopted the trappings of an Islamist, wearing a pakol (wool hat) and a checkered Palestinian keffiyeh over white robes. Encouraged by his transformation, his brother appointed him as the deputy cleric of Lal Masjid, although he rarely led the prayers there. Ghazi, however, still retained the courteous manner and open-minded curiosity of his student years. He welcomed foreign visitors at his quarters, charming and cajoling them.

He first came on the political scene in 2001, when the religious parties of the country announced an organization for the defense of Afghanistan against the American invasion. Abdul Rashid Ghazi pledged support for the Taliban against the Americans, criticizing Musharraf for his submissive attitude towards them and openly challenging his authority.

In 2003, he led the funeral of Azam Tariq inside Lal Masjid.

In August 2004, the Pakistan government claimed he was involved in a plot against the president, the army and parliament; however this was later refuted by the government minister for religious affairs, and later by the government.

He was fond of technology and had all the latest communication being an expert of computers, he established a data centre, which had all the necessary equipment including computers, faxes, printers, and scanner. To broadcast his speeches on the Internet, he had been maintaining his own website which was blocked later.

Jamia Faridia

Ghazi also served as Vice-Chancellor of Faridia University, an Islamic university situated near the Faisal Mosque in Islamabad, Pakistan.

Ghazi is credited with modernization of the institute where alongside the traditional Dars-i Nizami, he introduced new academic programmes including information technology, Islamic Economics and himself taught English and Philosophy.

in 2003, he inaugurated the Al Faridia Model School, a free for all high school offering classes from 7th till matriculation.

Farid Esack recounts to have met Ghazi multiple times at the Faridia University seminary, Ghazi peppered the South African with questions about Mandela's life in prison, and they chatted for hours about revolutionaries like Che Guevara and Fidel Castro. "He certainly saw himself in that mold, as the righteous moral rebel." Esack said, both of them are also said to have debated their conflicting opinions on Islam, "My vision of an inclusive polity influenced by progressive Islamic values is very different than Ghazi's, of course, but his theology should not be reduced to a caricature, as it so often was, especially in the West", Esack recounted.

Activism
Ghazi was a well-known activist against enforced disappearances in Pakistan. In 2004, he founded Defense of Muslim Rights, and in 2006, he co-founded Defence of Human Rights Pakistan, together with human rights activist Amina Masood Janjua and Khalid Khawaja. The Al-Qasim Foundation was also set up by Ghazi immediately after the 2005 Earthquake and delivered relief goods worth Rs100 million to affectees under his supervision.

UNICEF
In 2005, Ghazi joined UNICEF, a United Nations led humanitarian organisation, where he was a member of committee formed to raise awareness regarding aids.

The following year, Ghazi joined a delegation of religious leaders, led by United Nations official Bettina Schunter, to travel to South Africa to learn about HIV prevention. This trip was aimed at improving the efforts of religious leaders in combating the spread of HIV and AIDS in their communities.

Assassination attempt
In early 2005, one morning just after dawn, Ghazi was returning from teaching a class at the Faridia University (which he managed and was the vice-chancellor of). He was driving along a four-lane highway in the shadow of the Margalla Hills when he noticed that someone in a nearby car was waving a gun at him. Ghazi fired warning shots from his licensed pistol, confusing the assassins, after which they sped away. It's the reason why he always carried an AK-47.

Death and legacy

During the Siege of Lal Masjid, Pakistan Army Special Forces (SF), Pakistan Army Rangers, and Special Service Group (SSG) stormed the mosque. Ghazi himself remained inside with a few students. He called for a safe way in which he would not be humiliated like his brother, but officials denied his requests. The Pakistan Ministry of Interior reported that he was killed on 10 July 2007 during Operation Silence.

A few days after his death, his famous saying "We can be martyred but we will not surrender" was featured as quote of the day on Time magazine's website.

On 20 September 2007, bin Laden released a new tape called "Come to Jihad" with his voice over previously released footage of him. In the tape bin Laden called on Pakistanis, especially the soldiers, to overthrow President Pervez Musharraf, promising what he called retaliation for the storming of the Red Mosque, stating that "twenty years after the soil of Pakistan soaked up the blood of one of the greatest jihadi fighters, the Imam Abdallah Azzam, today Pakistan is witness to the death of another great Muslim, Imam Abdul al-Rashid Ghazi."

He is buried at Madrassah Abdullah, Basti-Abdullah near Rojhan Mazari, Pakistan. Ghazi's brother, Abdul Aziz, who was arrested during the eight-day siege, led the funeral with a large number of people from all the provinces of the country coming to the funeral at his native village.

Bibliography

Books by Ghazi
Islami nizam ka mujawwiza khaka (Proposed Blueprint of Islamic System)

References

External links 

 
 

1968 births
2007 deaths
Pakistani Muslims
Deobandis
Pakistani religious leaders
Baloch people
Quaid-i-Azam University alumni
People from Rajanpur District
People murdered in Islamabad